The Camuy River is a river in Puerto Rico. It is the third largest underground river in the world and helped shape the cave system known as the Rio Camuy Caves.

The river and water flow systems of Río Camuy have been studied by the US Geological Service in 1995.

Gallery

See also

 List of rivers of Puerto Rico

References

External links
 
 USGS Hydrologic Unit Map – Caribbean Region (1974)

Rivers of Puerto Rico